Diablo (Esteban Corazón de Ablo) is a supervillain appearing in American comic books published by Marvel Comics. The character is depicted as an evil alchemist, and an enemy of the Fantastic Four. Created by writer Stan Lee and artist Jack Kirby, the character first appeared in Fantastic Four #30 (September 1964).

Publication history

Diablo was created by writer Stan Lee and artist Jack Kirby, and first appeared in Fantastic Four #30 (September 1964).

In a 2013 interview with Chris Hardwick of Nerdist, creator Lee said that Diablo was his greatest regret because he could not remember the character aside from his name, who he is, and why he did what he did, saying, "When you create a character you should feel you know him".

Fictional character biography
Esteban Corazón de Ablo was a powerful alchemist in 9th century Saragossa, who sold his soul to the demon Mephisto to lengthen his life far beyond a human span.

Years later, Diablo set up a base in Transylvania where he made a pact with the Vampires.

The villagers had enough of him where they formed an angry mob and buried him within a stone crypt under his castle. Another century later, the Fantastic Four appeared in Transylvania on a vacation, when a local named Baron Hugo told them the legend of Diablo. That night, Diablo whispered to The Thing to awake and free him from his prison by pulling out the stone plug on his crypt and smashing the stone slab that covered him. Freed, Diablo offered a potion to the Thing that would turn him halfway into a human. In exchange for Ben's services for a year, he would give him the other potion that would finalize the change. When the rest of the Fantastic Four arrived, they found Ben working for Diablo. They fought with him and tried to convince him to leave his service, but Ben refused, and the three were forced to leave him behind. Diablo soon made his appearance known to the world, and sold his alchemic chemicals internationally, making him the richest man on the planet. Shortly before the rest of the world, Mister Fantastic discovered that Diablo's chemicals worked, but only for a short while, before failing. The world turned on Diablo, but he had already built up an army of loyal followers and was prepared to use his alchemic powers to conquer the planet. But once Diablo had revealed his true intentions, the Fantastic Four were free to attack him. At the same time, the Thing had also discovered that the potion he was given wore off, and he turned on Diablo, but Diablo used one of his chemical pellets to knock him out and seal him in an unbreakable, glass capsule. The remaining three members of the Fantastic Four soon attacked Diablo's fortress, but after a struggle, Diablo managed to capture them with his chemical pellets. Diablo sealed up the last of the Fantastic Four in the same capsules, but Ben quickly escaped when his broke down. Angered, he chased Diablo through his own castle, until he crushed a suit of armor into a giant ball, and threw it after him. Diablo ran from it, hiding within the crypt that the villagers had sealed him in. The Thing followed behind him and reinserted the giant, stone plug, and then smashed it with both fists, causing the entire castle to come crumbling down upon the crypt. The Fantastic Four were later freed, and the Human Torch melted the stone into slag to harden Diablo's prison.

But Diablo eventually used his potions to destroy his melted stone prison, and escape to get revenge on the Fantastic Four. His next move was to travel to North America and New York's State University, where he helped Professor Gilbert to animate his android creation, Dragon Man. He turned the Dragon Man against the Fantastic Four, but it eventually turned on him and drove both of them underneath a frozen lake, where he was lost for a time. Diablo later reactivated the Dragon Man, creating a whole army of Dragon Men. He was defeated by the Avengers, however.

Diablo later clashed with Doctor Doom. He next took the Inhuman, Crystal, captive. He took control of Terra Verde, but was ultimately defeated by the Human Torch. Diablo later recruited Darkoth as a pawn to battle Doctor Doom, but was betrayed by Darkoth. Diablo later sent elementals to battle the Fantastic Four, and battled Iron Man after that.

It was later revealed that Diablo had a romantic relationship with the woman who became the criminal Gilded Lily. Diablo was freed from prison by Gilded Lily, though he turned against her and was defeated by Alpha Flight. Diablo later attacked the Fantastic Four, again using elementals against them. Diablo conquered the country of Tierra del Maiz, and in another clash with Alpha Flight, he was apparently killed.

However, Diablo survived and reappeared again later. He was later responsible for the destruction of the Fantastic Four's headquarters, Pier 4. He aided the Fantastic Four in driving the chaos demon Shuma-Gorath back to its home dimension.

Diablo has also fought Spider-Man. After escaping Spider-Man, he is approached by Ana Kravinoff who states that her mother would like to speak with him.

Some time later, he has become a subject of the new Night Thrasher's interest.

He was later seen in Vieques, an island–municipality of Puerto Rico, where he helped Spider-Man and the Human Torch defeat a giant radioactive sea monster that was devouring the residents and tourists.

During The Gauntlet storyline, Diablo is present with Electro, Ana Kravinoff, Sasha Kravinoff, and Alyosha Kravinoff when Mattie Franklin is sacrificed as part of a ritual that resurrects Vladimir Kravinoff as a humanoid lion creature.

During the Origin of the Species storyline, Diablo is invited by Doctor Octopus to join his supervillain team where he promises them that they will receive a reward in exchange for securing some specific items for him. Ever since Lily Hollister's baby was stolen by the Chameleon, Spider-Man had been going on a rampage against any villains involved. The police recovered a web ball containing Spot, Diablo, and Overdrive.

Diablo is later recruited by Max Fury to join the Shadow Council's incarnation of the Masters of Evil.

Sometime later, Diablo kidnaps Maria Hill to acquire the security code clearances to all active helicarriers and the Triskelion but is defeated by a reformed Doctor Doom.

Diablo is later shown using a cloning spell on a Moloid to excavate a mystical artifact when he is ambushed by the Inhuman known as Mosaic, who destroys the artifact and forces him to surrender.

Powers and abilities
Diablo is a practitioner of the alchemic sciences, based upon reconstructing molecules by mystical means, and has obtained this knowledge through study. Thanks to his tutors, he was educated and is self-taught in these arcane arts. His youth and vitality have been lengthened, due to a longevity serum. He can affect his own body by changing the appearance to look like a different person or become "nerveless protoplasm", which protects him from certain forms of harm.

Diablo employs a huge arsenal of alchemical weapons that he discovered or invented, and conceals within hidden pouches and pockets in his costume. But unknown to science, his concoctions are almost magical in nature. Although the range of his power is wide, these effects are temporary unless Diablo provides a second dose, with the exception of an elixir he used on Dragon Man. His mixtures include nerve gas pellets, freezing potions, and pills that make people susceptible to Diablo's hypnotic orders. He can also transmute non-organic matter (stones to feathers, water to ice, etc.), unleash explosive blasts, model surface features, give life to inanimate objects, and create beings formed from the elements of earth, fire, wind, and water called "elementals". Other concoctions utilize teleportation for quick escapes.

Other versions

Age of Apocalypse
In the Age of Apocalypse reality, Diablo and the Absorbing Man work as prison wardens for one of the many prisons maintained for Apocalypse. This particular one is located in a section of Aztec ruins in Mexico. He is killed by Nightcrawler during X-Men's mission to rescue Robert Kelly, a mutant-human peace activist.

Marvel Zombies
In the Marvel Zombies reality, Diablo appears as one of the many zombiefied super-powered beings hoping for access to the Kingpin's human cloning vats. He successfully trades several cans of cat food for his desired time. He then made friends with zombie Scorpion. Zombie Diablo then kills himself by ripping out the skull and severely crushed it after one of his arms are ripped apart.

Ultimate Marvel
The Ultimate Universe version of Diablo is named Menendez Flores instead of Esteban Corazón de Ablo. He made his Ultimate Universe debut in Ultimate Fantastic Four #39. In that issue, it was revealed that he was an evil alchemist who had been confined by the good alchemist Andrea Vecchiato to a "tower with no door" in 15th century Milan. Along with the help of his hunchback henchman Peppone, he reached across time to kidnap people close to the Fantastic Four, only to challenge them to a contest. He intended to use Reed's sister as an important part of his plan for immortality. The Four, along with a contingent of soldiers led by Willie Lumpkin, head back in time to oppose him. He was defeated and vanishes after being touched by Reed's temporarily super-powered sister Enid.

In other media

Television
 Diablo appears in a self-titled episode of Fantastic Four (1967), voiced by Regis Cordic.
 Diablo appears in the Fantastic Four: World's Greatest Heroes episode "Johnny Storm and the Potion of Fire", voiced by Trevor Devall.
 Diablo appears in Marvel Disk Wars: The Avengers, voiced by Tomohisa Aso in the Japanese version and Matthew Mercer in the English dub.

Video games
 Diablo appears in Fantastic Four (2005), voiced by André Sogliuzzo.
 Diablo appears in Marvel Contest of Champions.

References

External links
 Diablo at Marvel.com

Comics characters introduced in 1964
Characters created by Jack Kirby
Characters created by Stan Lee
Fantastic Four characters
Fictional alchemists
Fictional characters with immortality 
Marvel Comics characters who use magic
Marvel Comics male supervillains
Marvel Comics mutates
Marvel Comics supervillains